|}

The Ulster Derby is a flat handicap horse race in Northern Ireland open to three-year-old horses. It is run at Down Royal over a distance of 1 mile 4 furlongs and 150 yards (2,551 metres), and it is scheduled to take place each year in June.

The event was established in 1936, and it was originally restricted to three-year-olds. For a period it was contested over 1 mile, 4 furlongs and 68 yards. It was opened to older horses in 1994, and increased in distance to 1 mile, 4 furlongs and 190 yards (2,588 metres). In 2014 it was restricted to three-year-olds again and reduced to 1 mile and 3 furlongs (2, 213 metres) before being increased to its present distance in 2015.

The Ulster Derby is Northern Ireland's most valuable flat race.

Records
Most successful horse:
 no horse has won this race more than once

Leading jockey since 1962 (4 wins):
 Tommy Murphy – Dumbwaiter (1974), Caucasus (1975), Transworld (1977), Encyclopedia (1978)

Leading trainer since 1962 (7 wins):
 Vincent O'Brien – Onandaga (1969), Tantoul (1971), Dumbwaiter (1974), Caucasus (1975), Transworld (1977), Encyclopedia (1978), Baba Karam (1987)
 Jim Bolger - Nordic Region (1990), Kirov Premiere (1993), Citizen Edward (2001,dd-ht), Wexford Town (2014), Stellar Mass (2016), Clongowes (2017), Change of Velocity (2018)

Winners since 1988
 Weights given in stones and pounds.

Earlier winners

 1936: Black Domino
 1937: Owenstown
 1948: Soodani
 1954: Red Winter
 1962: Atlantis
 1963: Christmas Island
 1964: Netherby
 1965: Newsrullah
 1966: My Kuda
 1967: Dan Kano
 1968: Stitch
 1969: Onandaga
 1970: Dubrava
 1971: Tantoul
 1972: Falaise
 1973: French Fable
 1974: Dumbwaiter
 1975: Caucasus
 1976: Captain Memory
 1977: Transworld
 1978: Encyclopedia
 1979: The Bart
 1980: Sheringham
 1981: Dance Bid
 1982: Affiance
 1983: Sir Simon
 1984: Sondrio
 1985: Rising
 1986: Don Diege
 1987: Baba Karam

See also
 Horse racing in Ireland
 List of Irish flat horse races

References

 Racing Post:
 downroyal.com – Previous winners of the Ulster Derby.
 pedigreequery.com – Ulster Derby – Down Royal.

Flat races in Ireland
Flat horse races for three-year-olds
Recurring sporting events established in 1936
Horse races in Northern Ireland
1936 establishments in Northern Ireland
Down Royal Racecourse